Plains High School is a public high school located in the city of Plains, Texas and classified as a 2A school by the UIL. It is part of the Plains Independent School District located in north central Yoakum County. In 2013, the school was rated "Met Standard" by the Texas Education Agency.  A new school complex to house the elementary, middle and high school was completed and opened in fall of 2013.

Athletics
Plains High School participates in the following sports:

Cross Country, Football, Volleyball, Basketball, Powerlifting, Golf, Track, Baseball, and Softball

Baseball
Basketball
Cross Country
Football
Golf
Powerlifting
Softball
Track and field
Volleyball

State titles
Girls Basketball 
2014 (1A)
Boys Cross Country 
1993 (1A), 2004 (1A), 2009 (1A), 2022 (2A)
Volleyball 
1967 (1A), 1968 (1A), 1969 (1A), 1970 (1A), 1971 (1A), 1985 (2A), 1988 (1A), 1989 (1A), 1990 (1A)

Band
UIL Marching Band State Champions 
1991 (1A), 1995 (1A)

Theater
One Act Play 
2011 (1A), 2012 (1A)

References

External links
Plains Independent School District

Schools in Yoakum County, Texas
Public high schools in Texas